Charles Casimir Apolskis (December 18, 1914 – May 10, 1967) was a former American football defensive end in the National Football League. He played for the Chicago Bears and Chicago Cardinals.

1914 births
1967 deaths
American football defensive ends
American people of Lithuanian descent
Chicago Bears players
Chicago Cardinals players
DePaul Blue Demons football players
People from Cicero, Illinois
Players of American football from Illinois